Andrew Ford (born June 19, 1989) is a Canadian competition swimmer.  He competed in the 200-metre individual medley race at the 2012 Summer Olympics; he placed first in his heat with a time of 2:00.28, but his time of 2:01.58 in the semifinal did not qualify him for the final.

References

1989 births
Living people
Canadian male medley swimmers
Olympic swimmers of Canada
Sportspeople from Guelph
Swimmers at the 2012 Summer Olympics
20th-century Canadian people
21st-century Canadian people